Clinton, West Virginia may refer to:

Clinton, Boone County, West Virginia, an unincorporated community in Boone County
Clinton, Ohio County, West Virginia, an unincorporated community in Ohio County